Albert W. Aiken (1846-1894) was American actor and author of plays and dime novels.  He was a prolific writer of pulp fiction for Beadle and Adams.

His plays included The Witches of New York. 

Aiken was the younger brother of George Aiken, best known for his popular adaptation of Uncle Tom's Cabin for the stage, and was also a cousin of the famous clown George Fox.

References

External links
 The Brigand Captain, or The Prairie Pathfinder (1877) (via archive.org)
 Gold Dan, or Dick Talbot in Utah (1898) (via archive.org)
 

1846 births
1894 deaths
American male stage actors
19th-century American male actors
19th-century American dramatists and playwrights
Dime novelists